James Eric Stevenson (born 14 January 1947) is a British child psychologist who is Emeritus Professor of Developmental Psychopathology at the University of Southampton. He is known for his research on behavior problems in children, such as attention-deficit hyperactivity disorder and reading disability. He was the founding editor of the Annual Research Review issue of the Journal of Child Psychology and Psychiatry, and subsequently served as the editor of this journal.

References

External links
Faculty page

Living people
1947 births
Child psychologists
Academics of the University of Southampton
Academic journal editors
Attention deficit hyperactivity disorder researchers
British psychologists